Sébastien Thill (born 29 December 1993) is a Luxembourgish professional footballer who plays as a midfielder for 2. Bundesliga club Hansa Rostock and the Luxembourg national team.

Club career

Luxembourg
From 2009 to 2012, Thill played for Pétange of the Luxembourg National Division, scoring nine goals in 46 league appearances.

In 2013, he moved to fellow National Division side Progrès Niederkorn. In 2015, Thill made his debut in European club competition as Niederkorn fell 3–0 on aggregate to Shamrock Rovers in a two-leg series during the first qualifying round of the 2015–16 UEFA Europa League.

On 4 July 2017, Thill scored the winning goal in an unexpected 2–1 aggregate win against Scottish side Rangers for his current club, Progrès Niederkorn, in the UEFA Europa League first qualifying round. The goal sealed Progrès' first ever win in European Competition.

On 5 September 2020, he joined Russian club Tambov on a season-long loan. His brother Olivier also played in the Russian league.

Sheriff Tiraspol
On 20 January 2021, he joined Moldovan league club Sheriff Tiraspol on a 1.5-year loan. While on loan at the Transnistrian club, he earned headlines with a long range goal against Spanish giants Real Madrid to secure a 2–1 victory in the UEFA Champions League group stage. With his goal against Real Madrid on 28 September 2021, he became the first Luxembourgish player to score a goal in the tournament's history. Thill followed up this goal on the subsequent matchday with an equalising free-kick against reigning Italian champions Inter Milan.

Hansa Rostock
In June 2022, 2. Bundesliga club Hansa Rostock announced the signing of Thill for the 2022–23 season.

International career
Thill made his senior international debut for Luxembourg on 5 September 2015 in a UEFA Euro 2016 qualifying match against Macedonia. In the match, Thill scored in second-half stoppage time for his first international goal as Luxembourg earned a 1–0 victory, lifting them from the bottom position in Group C.

Personal life
Thill is the older brother of fellow Luxembourg internationals Olivier Thill and Vincent Thill. He is also the son of former international footballer Serge Thill.

Career statistics

Scores and results list Luxembourg's goal tally first, score column indicates score after each Thill goal.

Honours
Sheriff Tiraspol
 Moldovan National Division: 2020–21, 2021–22
 Moldovan Cup: 2021–22

References

External links
 
 
 

1993 births
Sportspeople from Luxembourg City
Living people
Luxembourgian footballers
Luxembourg international footballers
Association football midfielders
FC Progrès Niederkorn players
FC Tambov players
FC Sheriff Tiraspol players
FC Hansa Rostock players
Luxembourg National Division players
Russian Premier League players
Moldovan Super Liga players
Luxembourgian expatriate footballers
Luxembourgian expatriate sportspeople in Russia
Expatriate footballers in Russia
Luxembourgian expatriate sportspeople in Moldova
Expatriate footballers in Moldova
Luxembourgian expatriate sportspeople in Germany
Expatriate footballers in Germany